Notochloe is a genus of Australian plants in the grass family.

Species
The only known species is Notochloe microdon, found only in New South Wales.

References

Danthonioideae
Monotypic Poaceae genera
Endemic flora of Australia